Lincolnshire InterConnect is a rural bus network in the county of Lincolnshire in the east of England.

A number of InterConnect-branded  interurban bus routes with fixed timetables are complemented by demand-responsive, flexible CallConnect minibuses, on which journeys must be booked in advance. Many of the InterConnect services are provided by Stagecoach in Lincolnshire; CallConnect services are run by a variety of operators including TransportConnect Ltd who are a wholly owned company of Lincolnshire County Council.

InterConnect was first established in 1999, when the existing RoadCar "Connect 6"  Lincoln–Skegness bus (introduced in 1998 as part of Route 6's rebrand) was rebranded and its service frequency increased. CallConnect was established in 2001. The network and its services are subsidised by Lincolnshire County Council. Some services were scaled back in 2011–2012, following cuts to local government funding, and reductions in the Bus Service Operators Grant fuel duty subsidy.

List of InterConnect routes

Current routes

The various models of double-decker bus used by Stagecoach in Lincolnshire for its InterConnect services are painted in a special purple-and-gold livery which is different from the standard Stagecoach colour scheme. Some buses have route-specific numbered branding, in particular the flagship InterConnect 6 service, and a "Coastal Connect" brand used on the routes serving towns and villages on the Lincolnshire coast. Buses from the other InterConnect operators tend to carry that operator's standard paint scheme. All the InterConnect branded bus routes have hourly services throughout the day Monday to Saturday (with the exception of Interconnect 505; that runs up to every 20 minutes) with some services running on Sundays and Bank Holidays too (but on a reduced timetable).

Former routes

CallConnect services
There are two kinds of CallConnect services – entirely demand-responsive 'dial-a-ride' services which serve an area with no fixed route or timetable, and semi-flexible services which run to a timetable but which deviate off the route to serve smaller villages. Journeys on CallConnect must be booked in advance over the telephone or online. CallConnect buses are designed to meet the fixed InterConnect services at designated 'interchange' points in the larger towns and villages.

Through ticketing is available between some InterConnect routes and CallConnect services, and vice versa. Through ticketing is also available between CallConnect buses in the Sleaford & Metheringham area, and East Midlands Trains rail services from Sleaford and Metheringham railway stations on the Peterborough to Lincoln Line.

In 2011, Lincolnshire County Council reported a 23.5% increase in usage of CallConnect compared to the previous year.

CallConnect areas
CallConnect services operate in 14 named areas across Lincolnshire (and extending into neighbouring counties) – only the city of Lincoln and its nearby villages, and the unitary authority of North East Lincolnshire are not covered by CallConnect. The areas covered are:

Semi-flexible CallConnect services

External links 

 More up to date information
 Lincolnshire InterConnect website
 CallConnect online journey booking form
 InterConnect Network Guide
 Lincsbus: public transport information for Lincolnshire
 InterConnect Flexible Bus Services : Department for Transport leaflet (2003)
 Making connections in Lincs : Bus and Coach Magazine (2006)
 CJ Conversions LTD - builders of the Call Connect vehicles

References 

Transport in Lincolnshire